Versailles is an unincorporated community in Rutherford County, in the U.S. state of Tennessee.

History
A post office called Versailles was established in 1840, and remained in operation until 1906. Besides the post office, the community contained a country store.

References

Unincorporated communities in Rutherford County, Tennessee
Unincorporated communities in Tennessee